Karl Johannes August Väli (22 January 1882, Rapla Parish, Harju County – May 1925 Tallinn) was an Estonian politician. He was a member of Estonian Constituent Assembly. On 24 July 1919, he resigned his position and he was replaced by Nikolai Maim.

References

1882 births
1925 deaths
Members of the Estonian Constituent Assembly